The International School of Business, Kolkata is a leadership and management school in Kolkata, West Bengal, India imparting management education since 2002.

The Institute, which is a part of the IndiSmart Group, Kolkata, has a global association with Edinburgh Napier University, UK and strong academic links with Queen Margaret University in Edinburgh, UK and some of the top universities and centers of excellence worldwide. The institute is located in Bidhannagar, Kolkata, the IT hub of Eastern India in a sprawling building, located close to the best known multinational IT companies like IBM, CTS, TCS, WIPRO, PWC, Siemens etc.

References

External links
Official Website

Business schools in Kolkata
Educational institutions established in 2002
2002 establishments in West Bengal